In taxonomy, Haloferax (common abbreviation: Hfx.) is a genus of the Haloferacaceae.

Genetic exchange

Cells of H. mediterranei and cells of the related species H. volcanii can undergo a process of genetic exchange between two cells which involves cell fusion resulting in a heterodiploid cell (containing two different chromosomes in one cell).  Although this genetic exchange ordinarily occurs between two cells of the same species, it can also occur at a lower frequency between an H. mediterranei and an H. volcani cell. These two species have an average nucleotide sequence identity of 86.6%.  During this exchange process, a diploid cell is formed that contains the full genetic repertoire of both parental cells, and genetic recombination is facilitated.  Subsequently, the cells separate, giving rise to recombinant cells.

Taxonomy
As of 2022, 13 species are validly published under the genus Haloferax.

Proposed species
Several species and novel binomial names have been proposed, but not validly published.
 Haloferax antrum, Haloferax opilio, Haloferax rutilus and Haloferax viridis were isolated from Romanian salt lakes and first proposed as new species in 2006. Only H. prahovense, that was proposed along them has since been validly published.
 Haloferax berberensis was isolated in Algeria and proposed as new species in 2005.
 Haloferax litoreum, Haloferax marinisediminis and Haloferax marinum were first published in 2021, but are not accepted as of 2022.
 Haloferax marisrubri and Haloferax profundi were first published in 2020, but is not accepted as of 2022.
 Haloferax massilisiensis or Haloferax massiliense was first published in 2016 and again in 2018 as human associated halophilic archaeon. As of 2022, this species is not accepted.

See also
 Archaea
 Homologous recombination
 Extremophile

References

Further reading

External links
Haloferax at BacDive -  the Bacterial Diversity Metadatabase
NCBI Taxonomy browser

Archaea genera
Taxa described in 1986